Christian Dubois-Millot, pen name Christian Millau (30 December 1928 – 5 August 2017), was a French food critic and author.

Born in Paris, he began his career as a journalist in the "interior policy" department of Le Monde newspaper. In 1965 he founded the Gault Millau restaurant guide Le Nouveau Guide with Henri Gault and André Gayot. He launched the famed Gault & Millau guide in 1969 with Henri Gault, which helped galvanise the movement of young French chefs developing lighter, more inventive and beautiful looking dishes. Some 100,000 copies of the guide were sold that year. He was originally slated to be one of the judges at the historic Judgment of Paris wine tasting event of 1976 but was replaced by his brother Claude Dubois-Millot.

His friends announced his death on 7 August 2017 at the age of 88.

Published works 
 (with Marianne Rufenacht) La Belle Époque à table, Gault-Millau, 1981
 Dining in France  Stewart, Tabori & Chang 1986 
 La France à la carte Gault-Millau 1986 
 The Best of San Francisco & Northern California Hungry Minds Inc. 1988 
 The Best of Los Angeles Gault-Millau 1988 
 The Best of London Gault-Millau 1990 
 Les fous du palais: Drôle de voyage au pays des gourmands R. Laffont 1994 
 The Best of Paris Gault-Millau 1994 
 Au galop des hussards: Dans le tourbillon littéraire des années 50 Fallois 1999   Grand Prix de l' Académie française de la biographie, Prize Joseph Kessel.
 Paris m'a dit: Années 50, fin d'une époque Fallois 2000 
 Bon baisers du goulag. Secrets de famille. PLON 2004 
 Commissaire Corcoran Editions Feryane 2004  
 Dieu est-il Gascon ? Le Rocher 2006 
 Guide des restaurants fantômes. Ou les ridicules de la société française. Plon 2007 
 Le passant de Vienne. Un certain Adolf Éditions du Rocher, 2010
 Journal impoli, 2011-1928 Editions du Rocher 2011 
  Dictionnaire d'un peu tout et n'importe quoi, Editions du Rocher, 2013,

See also
 
 
 Club des Cent

References

1928 births
Journalists from Paris
2017 deaths
Lycée Janson-de-Sailly alumni
French radio presenters
Wine critics
French food writers
Restaurant critics
20th-century French non-fiction writers
21st-century French non-fiction writers
Commandeurs of the Ordre des Arts et des Lettres
Joseph Kessel Prize recipients
20th-century French male writers
French male non-fiction writers